Tanzania (TAN) has competed at every occurrence of the African Games since its inauguration in 1965. Tanzanian athletes have won a total of 24 medals.

Medal summary
Filbert Bayi, who subsequently broke the world record in the 1500 metres, won the country's first gold medal in 1973. Other gold medalists include Samwel Mwera who beat Mbulaeni Mulaudzi at the Men's 800 metres in 2003. Although the country has not won a medal at every Games, Tanzanian athletes have achieved a total of twenty four medals, including four gold and ten silver.

Medal tables

Medals by Games

Below is a table representing all Tanzanian medals won at the Games.

See also 
 Tanzania at the Olympics
 Tanzania at the Paralympics
 Sport in Tanzania

References